Community economic development (CED) is a field of study that actively elicits community involvement when working with government, and private sectors to build strong communities, industries, and markets. It includes collaborative and participatory involvement of community dwellers in every area of development that affects their standard of living.

Community economic development encourages using local resources in a way that enhances economic opportunities while improving social conditions in a sustainable way. It equally facilitates the effective exploration and utilization of local resources for optimal community advantages. Often CED initiatives are implemented to overcome crises, and increase opportunities for communities who are disadvantaged. An aspect of “localizing economics,” CED is a community-centered process that blends social and economic development to foster the economic, social, ecological and cultural well-being of communities. For example, neighborhood business organizations target growth in specific commercial areas by lobbying government authorities for special tax rates and real estate developments.

Community economic development is an alternative to conventional economic development. Its central tenet is that: “... problems facing communities—unemployment, poverty, job loss, environmental degradation and loss of community control—need to be addressed in a holistic and participatory way.”

History 
Economic development has existed even at a basic level since the earliest recorded communities. However, in the US and several other countries, the concept of Community economic development emerged "in response to tenacious poverty and the need for affordable housing, good jobs, affordable health care and quality of life matters needed for human existence."

CED in the US
In the late 19th century reformers discovered less than desirable areas of the country where communities were overcrowded, unhealthy, poor and centered near factories, docks and various other places of employment. In the early twentieth century during the Progressive Era reformers began making connections between the condition of communities and "social ills" such as crime and poverty and ways to improve upon them. The Progressive agenda of political, social, and physical reform swept the nation and led to comprehensive antipoverty strategies, embodied by New Deal programs and other grants in the 1930s. Policies during this time were top-down and citizens being affected had very little input to the changes being made. Once communities began to be revitalized, segregation policy followed to determine who was allowed to live where. Housing policy and real estate practices stifled upward mobility for non-whites and their communities developed with unique characteristics and problems as a result. These actions shaped communities until the 1960s, when President LBJ signed into law many anti-discriminatory laws such as the Civil Rights Act of 1964 and also declared a war on poverty which brought renewal and upward mobility for many people. More loan programs, grants and fair housing policies were implemented throughout the 60's and 70's but still failed to be non-discriminatory on the basis of race in some cases thus shaping communities in a particular fashion. Social investment gained momentum once again in the 80's and 90's bringing change to communities across America. Municipal governments become more representative of the communities they serve and the public is more involved and can interact with bureaucracies and elected officials with greater ease. Many initiatives existed at this time to renew inner cities and rural areas while also tackling social issues such as eradicating drugs and improving education. The modern day CED movement is focused on renewing urban and rural communities. Social justice is a key component to policy and conversation about changes to be made. Citizens are engaged with bureaucracies and their elected officials through a variety of mediums such as social media. Input from the people has gained more value due to increased demands for transparency.

CED around the world
In Nigeria CED is approached with a central focus on sustainability referred to as Sustainable Community Development. This concept combines economic, social and environmental practices and policies that promote sustainability for future generations. Much of this began in the 1980s, 2 decades after gaining independence, when the World Bank declared Nigeria eligible to receive funds from the International Development Association (IDA).

In Asia for the last 60 years the Asian Foundation has supported Asian initiatives to foster inclusive economic growth and broaden economic opportunities. The Foundation designs and implements economic programs in three core areas business environments for private sector growth, Entrepreneurship Development and Regional Economic Cooperation.

Economic development is not just limited to developing countries. Canada's provincial governments have been encouraging and funding municipal economic development efforts for decades.

Theories and strategies
The most significant aspect of community economic development, aside from the fact that it focuses on economic development in specific localities, is that focuses on the process of community building.  This “community” aspect of CED assumes that the community will play a dynamic role in economic development processes and that community development will contribute to sustained economic development and vice versa.  In this understanding, the community is considered both as an input and output in this CED equation.

Looking at CED from an economic viewpoint, the initial purpose of such an approach is the creation of local jobs and the stimulation of business activity.  Integrally linked to these purposes are strategies to increase access to capital, stimulate asset building, improve the general business climate, and link citywide economic development efforts to specific community development efforts.

Increasing access to capital is an extremely important strategy for community economic development.  Historically, residents in poor neighborhoods have experienced great difficulty finding access to capital because they are traditionally viewed as credit risks.  In places where banks do offer services, these residents face other structural barriers such as minimum deposit requirements, high service fees, and complex paperwork.  To solve these problems, a community economic development approach would develop alternate neighborhood community development financial institutions such as community development credit unions, community development banks, and community development venture capital funds.

Improving the general business climate is also integral to community economic development.  Strategies to do so would include improving the infrastructure and physical appearance of commercial areas, the quality of quantity of residential housing, and the transportation systems in a neighborhood.  While these may not directly effect economic activities, they serve to strengthen the economic well being of an area because it encourages businesses to locate there.

Objectives and goals 
Community economic development exists in all developed countries but varies in the way it functions with the different systems of governments around the world. Research makes it apparent that there are common goals and objectives such as economic activities and programs that develop low-income communities. Community Development Corporations, reformers and other agencies have other common initiatives including services to fight homelessness, lack of jobs, drug abuse, violence and crime as well as quality medical and childcare and home ownership opportunities while also bringing economic prosperity. Another increasingly common objective is to preserve the character of communities and strong support for local business.

Countries across the globe participate in reinvestment and development through a bank such as the Community Reinvestment Act, World Bank and the IDA amongst many others. Another commonality for nations international is need to incorporate sustainability and the natural environment into the growth of societies.

Implementation
Several Communities across the United States have successfully crafted policy to create groups and corporations to assist in multiple facets of the communities economy and welfare. The following organizations are examples of Community Economic Development Initiatives.
  CPLC Southwest Inc Phoenix AZ
 Nogales Community Development Corporation Nogales AZ
 Enterprise + Economic Development Center, Inc. Fresno CA
 Valley Economic Development Center Van Nuys Ca
 Cornerstone West Community Development Corporation Wilmington DE
 Insight Development Corporation Indianapolis IN
 Kentucky Highlands Investment Corporation London KY
 The Good Work Network New Orleans LA
 EBCDC INC. East Boston MA
 Coastal Enterprises, Inc. (CEI) Brunswick ME
 Wayne State Univ. Research and Tech. Park in the City of Detroit Detroit MI
 Asian Economic Development Association Saint Paul MN
 Aurora-St. Anthony Neighborhood Development Corporation Saint Paul MN
 Hmong American Partnership Saint Paul MN
 Montana Community Development Corporation Missoula MT
 UDI Community Development Corporation Durham NC
 Intersect Fund Corporation New Brunswick NJ
 Capacity Builders, Inc. Farmington NM
 Business Outreach Center Network, Inc. Brooklyn NY
 Neighbors in the Strip, Inc. Pitsburg PA
 Westmoreland Human Opportunities dba West. Community Action Greensburg PA

The Western Australian Government Department of Commerce and Trade had an active Community Economic Development Branch working within Regional Development during the 1990s.  They ran programs in Small Town Economic Planning (STEP) program in which local communities were asked to bring together a cross section of influential groups representative of the community for a one- or two-day community planning event, after which they were given a grant of up to $15,000 for the implementation of initiatives identified, for a considerable number of the state's 158 Local Government Councils. They also ran a Community Auditing initiative and with the Office of the Minister of Agriculture, ran a Community Development Program, training local people in the skills of Community Economic Development.  The reorganisation of the Department in 2002 saw the name changed to Community Capacity Building and the Department itself was reorganised as the Department of Regional Development and Local Government until 2007 after which the Community Capacity Building Branch was disbanded.

In Brazil, the Banco Palmas has established Community Economic Development initiatives through the use and development of a community currency.  The community has prospered and has been widely adopted so that by 2011 there were 43 community banks within the country using the Banco Palmas model.  The Brazilian government has since encouraged the movement and in 2015 there were more than 100 initiatives in various parts of the country.

Obstacles
In the US, Community Economic Development projects are often funded by commercial banks within the structure of the Community Reinvestment Act.  This Act of Congress took effect in November, 1978. It is administered by banks and other financial institutions and has been instrumental in helping the owners of smaller businesses navigate the steps of obtaining loans for development projects.   A bank will operate a separate division within their loan department that focuses its expertise on small business services, as well as training and education.
Because projects brought to CRA bank departments are often from areas of lower economic standing and/or unproven consumer markets, they are a larger risk to lenders.  This heavier risk brings more stringent underwriting guidelines, in addition to often rigid government requirements. Many financial institutions state that these rules are cumbersome and difficult to comply with.

As a career
There are several CED corporations and nonprofits that employ Community Economic Development Officers to implement development plans.

Those involved in implementing a Community Economic Development Plan – not only the development officers, but also public administrators and small business owners – will serve different functions, as plans vary from community to community.  The community economic development officer will create studies to determine what a certain community's goals are and send them to the appropriate municipal offices or economic development committees.  A community economic development officer will assist in implementing a development plan by researching local zoning ordinances and laws, helping community partners acquire financing for economic development, acting as a liaison with various local, state, and federal agencies, making recommendations to the appropriate authorities on community economic development, and serving as an advocate within a community.

Most employers require a bachelor's degree in Economics or Community Development as a minimum.  For better opportunities, pursuing a Master of Public Planning, Urban Planning, Economic Development, or Community Economic Development is recommended. The annual median salary for a Community Economic Development Officer in the United States is $64,028.

See also
 List of community topics
 Community building
 Community development
 Community economic analysis
 Community engagement
 Community Futures
 Community practice
 Community service
 Social economy
 Socioeconomic engineering
 Urban planning

References

External links
 The Canadian CED Network
 Statement of CED Principles
 CED Gateway (index)
 Glen C. Pulver "father of community economics"
 Center for Community and Economic Development 
 U.S. Department of Health and Human Services - Community Economic Development

Community development
Economic growth
Economic development